Dane Hyatt (born 22 January 1984) is a Jamaican sprinter, competing in the 200 metres and 400 metres.

In June 2012 Hyatt won the Jamaica Olympic trials 400m in a new personal best of 44.83 to qualify for the Jamaican team for the 2012 Summer Olympics, beating Rusheen McDonald and Jermaine Gonzales. In the 2012 Olympics Dane was eliminated in the semi-final of the 400 metres.

International competitions

References

External links

1984 births
Living people
People from Trelawny Parish
Jamaican male sprinters
Athletes (track and field) at the 2012 Summer Olympics
Olympic athletes of Jamaica
World Athletics Championships athletes for Jamaica
Athletes (track and field) at the 2015 Pan American Games
World Athletics Indoor Championships medalists
Pan American Games competitors for Jamaica
20th-century Jamaican people
21st-century Jamaican people